Veljko Radenović (17 May 1955 – 29 September 2012) was a Serbian police lieutenant colonel, popularly known as "General" for his courage and capability. During the war in Kosovo he was commander of a special police unit from Prizren until the withdrawal of the Yugoslav Army from Kosovo in June 1999.

Biography 
In the war he led his unit in clashes with the Kosovo Liberation Army. His unit participated in the 1998 Attack on Orahovac where they successfully defended the town. The Kosovo Liberation Army blockaded the local Serbian population for several days. Radenović led his unit in the attack that ended the siege.

In popular culture 
In his honor Gavrilo Kujundžić wrote the song "Đenerale, đenerale" originally performed by Ivana Žigon and Kosovski Božuri.

References

External links

1955 births
2012 deaths
Military personnel from Peja
Kosovo Serbs
Serbian generals
Serbian military personnel of the Kosovo War
Serbia and Montenegro military personnel